Glycosylamines are a class of biochemical compounds consisting of a glycosyl group attached to an amino group, -NR2. They are also known as N-glycosides, as they are a type of glycoside. Glycosyl groups can be derived from carbohydrates. The glycosyl group and amino group are connected with a β-N-glycosidic bond, forming a cyclic hemiaminal ether bond (α-aminoether).

Examples include nucleosides such as adenosine.

References

Biomolecules
Carbohydrates